Person of Interest is an American science fiction crime drama television series created by Jonathan Nolan, who serves as an executive producer alongside J. J. Abrams, Bryan Burk, Chris Fisher, Greg Plageman, and Denise Thé. The series premiered on CBS on September 22, 2011, and stars Jim Caviezel as John Reese, a former CIA agent who is presumed dead. He is approached by a mysterious billionaire named Harold Finch (Michael Emerson) who is trying to prevent violent crimes before they happen by using an advanced surveillance system dubbed "The Machine" that provides the Social Security number of a person of interest who will be involved in an imminent lethal crime as either a perpetrator or a victim. Their unique brand of vigilante justice attracts the attention of two NYPD officers, Joss Carter (Taraji P. Henson) and Lionel Fusco (Kevin Chapman), whom Reese uses to his advantage as he investigates the person of interest. Reese and Finch are later aided by Samantha "Root" Groves (Amy Acker), a highly intelligent computer hacker and contract killer whom the Machine later identifies as its "analog interface", and Sameen Shaw (Sarah Shahi), a former ISA assassin who unknowingly dealt with the "relevant" numbers found by the Machine.

Series overview

Episodes

Season 1 (2011–12)

Season 2 (2012–13)

Season 3 (2013–14)

Season 4 (2014–15)

Season 5 (2016)

Ratings

Home media releases

References

External links 
 

Lists of American crime drama television series episodes
Episodes

it:Person of Interest (serie televisiva)#Episodi